Le Bourget-du-Lac (literally Le Bourget of the Lake) or  is a commune in the Savoie department in the Auvergne-Rhône-Alpes region in eastern/south-eastern France.

Climate
Le Bourget-du-Lac is right on the boundary between a mid-latitude, four seasons humid subtropical climate (Cfa) and an oceanic climate (Cfb) under the Köppen system. In spite of this, it is highly influenced by its interior position within France, near several mountain ranges, resulting in quite hot summers and winters with frequent temperatures below freezing, especially at night. Convective rainfall is frequent for much of the year, rendering high precipitation/day quotas. The nearest weather station is located at Chambéry Airport, 3 km east of the town.

Gallery

See also
Communes of the Savoie department

References

External links

Official site

 
Communes of Savoie